Richard Barone is an American rock musician who first gained attention as frontman for the Bongos. He works as a songwriter, arranger, author, director, and record producer, releases albums as a solo artist, tours, and has created concert events at Carnegie Hall, Hollywood Bowl, SXSW, and New York's Central Park. He serves on the Board of Governors for The Recording Academy (Grammys) and the Board of Advisors for Anthology Film Archives, and is affiliated with the Clive Davis Institute of Recorded Music at New York University and The New School for Jazz and Contemporary Music.

Biography
Richard Barone was born in Tampa, Florida, and began his career at age seven on local top-40 radio station WALT (now known as WTIS) as the Littlest DJ. By age sixteen he was producing local bands and recorded the idiosyncratic performer Tiny Tim after the two met following a Tampa performance. It was Tiny Tim who first suggested to Barone that he should live in Greenwich Village, where Tim himself had gotten his start. Moving to New York, Barone lived briefly at the Hotel Chelsea, modeled, and landed small acting roles. Answering an advertisement in the Village Voice newspaper led him to meet the musicians with whom he would soon form the Bongos, a critically acclaimed new wave band that helped to create the 1980s Hoboken, New Jersey indie pop community.

The Bongos quickly gained favor at New York City music venues as well as at their home venue, Maxwell's in Hoboken. They were invited to perform at the Rainbow Theatre in London as part of a concert that included other new bands on the scene, and was recorded for the live album Start Swimming on Stiff Records. A European tour with the Bush Tetras followed. After a string of independent singles released on the U.K.-based Fetish label were compiled in the U.S. as Drums Along the Hudson (PVC), and a major U.S. tour with The B-52s, the group signed to RCA Records. With the advent of MTV, they made commercial impact with the title song of their label debut, the Barone-penned "Numbers With Wings." The song's accompanying video earned the group a nomination at the first MTV Video Music Awards. Two more albums followed, one for RCA and one for Island Records, which was to remain unreleased until 2013.

Breaking out as a solo artist, Barone's albums have included chamber pop, orchestral, folk, and narrative singer-songwriter material. He has been called a "gifted pop-rock tunesmith" by The New York Times.

Barone released his first solo album, Cool Blue Halo (recorded live at The Bottom Line in New York) in 1987, prior to the Bongos' amicable breakup. Anthony DeCurtis, writing in Rolling Stone, praised Barone's "spare, elegant arrangements" and credited him with fashioning "a kind of rock chamber music."  While Trouser Press described the record as "intimate but confused," NPR's Tom Moon, in a more recent assessment, called the album "a plaintive masterpiece," adding "Cool Blue Halo feels timeless, and maybe even exotic." Moon also credited Barone's version of David Bowie's "The Man Who Sold the World" with influencing Nirvana's own cover of the song on their 1994 album MTV Unplugged in New York.

Two studio albums followed: the rock-dominated Primal Dream (MCA Records) in 1990, and the more acoustic-based Clouds Over Eden (Rhino Records), dedicated to his late friend, rock journalist Nicholas Schaffner, in 1994. Trouser Press championed the "fine set of yearning love songs" on Primal Dream, while calling their production and arrangements as a "step backwards" from his debut album.  But David Browne, writing in Rolling Stone, gave the album four stars and commented that "Barone is fast moving beyond the limited vocabulary of twelve strings and wimp-pop vocals."  Billy Altman, in The New York Times, called his next album, Clouds Over Eden "unquestionably the most fully realized effort of Barone's career," while Trouser Press described the album as "wrenching and thoroughly worthwhile" and "the great album fans always imagined [Barone] making."

In the mid-90s Barone performed and recorded with experimental guitarist Gary Lucas and his group Gods and Monsters, in which Barone handled lead vocals and played Mellotron. In 1995 he recorded Harry Nilsson's "I Guess the Lord Must Be in New York City," with Lucas on guitar, for the album For the Love of Harry: Everybody Sings Nilsson (BMG Records) and produced B-52's frontman Fred Schneider's version of "Coconut" for the same project. He performed the song with Schneider on Late Night With Conan O'Brien.

In 1996, he partnered with Phil Ramone and Larry Rosen's N2K Records label to become one of the first five artists, each representing different genres, to make their music available as purchasable digital downloads on the pioneering Music Boulevard retail site. Amidst the music industry's growing fear of the then-new technology of digital distribution, Barone appeared on The Wall Street Journal Report television show and other programs to explain and promote legal music downloading as a legitimate method of distribution.

In 1997, Barone released Between Heaven and Cello, a live album recorded primarily at NYC's intimate Fez nightclub during a series of "Guitar & Cello" shows. In November he performed in Bryter Later: The Music of Nick Drake at St. Ann's Warehouse in Brooklyn, N.Y., performing Drake's "Cello Song" and "Northern Sky." In that year, he also performed with David Johansen on Buster's Spanish Rocketship, the fourth album by Johansen's alter-ego Buster Poindexter, released on Island Records. Barone sang backing vocals on the album, credited as "Richard Barone and the Beautiful Bustiers." Also in 1997, Barone partnered with songwriter Jules Shear to co-host "Writers in the Round - Bluebird Style," a monthly series at The Bottom Line that featured Rosanne Cash, Ron Sexsmith, Susan Cowsill, and other singer/songwriters.

During this time, Barone began collaborating with producer Tony Visconti. Nine of the songs they wrote and recorded together over the next few years were released on the album Glow in 2010. Also during this period, he was invited to sing on sessions Visconti was producing for David Bowie, including the song "Mother," which would be released in 2021.

In 1999 he provided musical direction and orchestrations for the off-Broadway musical Bright Lights, Big City at the New York Theatre Workshop, working with Rent director Michael Greif. From 1999 to 2004, Barone directed and performed in The Downtown Messiah, a unique, multi-genre interpretation of Handel's baroque oratorio that was broadcast annually in December on over 200 public radio stations nationwide, and combined elements of pop, folk, blues, and jazz.

A boxed set of Barone's first three studio albums was released in Europe in 2000 as The Big Three by Line Records, Germany. In 2001, he contributed the track "Showdown"  to Lynne Me Your Ears - A Tribute to Jeff Lynne, a 32-track collection that included performances by Ringo Starr, Brian Wilson, Stevie Nicks and others. He also sang backing vocals for Tony Visconti's version of "Mr. Blue Sky" on the album, along with Kristeen Young.

As a concert producer/director, he began to create large-scale concert events, including three all-star tributes to Peggy Lee at Carnegie Hall, the Hollywood Bowl, and Chicago's Ravinia Festival in 2003 and 2004 in partnership with legendary concert impresario George Wein. The fully-orchestrated concerts spanned Lee's entire career and were staged as a musical biography. Performers included Bea Arthur, Nancy Sinatra, Rita Moreno, Debbie Harry, and Shirley Horn. For New York's Central Park SummerStage he created The Not-so Great American Songbook, a lovingly irreverent look at the guilty-pleasure hits of the 1970s, featuring an eclectic cast that included Justin Vivian Bond.

In 2004, Barone interviewed Quincy Jones for the PBS documentary Fever: The Music of Peggy Lee. That year also saw the first release on his own RBM Special Editions label, an anthology entitled Collection: An Embarrassment of Richard, composed of highlights from his back catalogue. The cover was photographed by Mick Rock, the first of many collaborations. In June, he performed in The Blood on the Tracks Project at Merkin Hall, a multi-artist tribute to Bob Dylan's landmark 1974 album on its thirtieth anniversary. He was accompanied by Tony Visconti on bass, Vernon Reid on guitar, and Buddy Cage, who had performed on the original album, on pedal steel.

Also that year, Barone joined 1960s folk-rock icon Donovan for a series of the latter's Beat Café concert events, including nine performances at New York's Joe's Pub, singing and reading excerpts from Allen Ginsberg's Howl.

Barone increasingly turned his attention to producing, including a duet between Liza Minnelli and pianist/vocalist Johnny Rodgers; a children's album for Jolie Jones (daughter of Quincy Jones); Fred Schneider for his solo album Just Fred; and others. During this time, he also collaborated with Schneider on songs for British pop sensation Sophie Ellis-Bextor.

Other projects during this time included executive-producing The Nomi Song DVD (Palm Pictures, 2005), which includes his remix of operatic New Wave countertenor Klaus Nomi's "Total Eclipse."  His songs and collaborations, including several written with singer-songwriter Jill Sobule, were heard on the TV shows The West Wing, Dawson's Creek, Felicity, and South of Nowhere.

In 2006, the original three Bongos reunited in the studio with Moby to create a re-make and music video of "The Bulrushes," an early Bongos single, for the re-issue of the group's debut album, released by Cooking Vinyl Records in June 2007. Several Bongos reunion concerts were held, culminating with an outdoor performance at the Hoboken Arts and Music Festival, during which the band was honored with a Mayoral Proclamation and the keys to the city.

In September 2007, Barone's memoir, Frontman: Surviving the Rock Star Myth, with cover and interior photos of the author by Mick Rock, was published by Backbeat/Hal Leonard Books. In late 2007, he began staging a series of musical readings of Frontman with excerpts of the book read by television actress Joyce DeWitt and radio personality Vin Scelsa, among others. On his birthday, October 1, 2008, he brought Frontman: A Musical Reading to the stage at Carnegie Hall in New York City, with "Special Guests and Legendary Friends," including Moby, Lou Reed, the Band's Garth Hudson, Marshall Crenshaw, Terre and Suzzy Roche, Randy Brecker, Carlos Alomar, DeWitt and others as a benefit for public radio station WFUV.

In July 2009, Barone entered the recording studio to complete production work on the album he began at age 16 for performer Tiny Tim. The album, I've Never Seen a Straight Banana - Rare Moments: Volume 1, was released in October 2009 on Collector's Choice Records.

In May 2010, Barone produced a concert to benefit Anthology Film Archives and to honor avant-garde filmmaker/author Kenneth Anger. Anger performed, along with Lou Reed, Sonic Youth, Jonas Mekas, Moby, actors Ben Foster and Philip Seymour Hoffman and others.

In July, Barone collaborated with Pete Seeger (then 91 years old), producing and performing in "Reclaim the Coast: Gulf Coast Oil Spill Benefit" at City Winery in New York. The next month, he and co-producer Matthew Billy recorded Seeger performing a new song that had been debuted publicly at the show. The song and video, "God's Counting on Me, God's Counting on You," recorded while sailing aboard the Sloop Clearwater, were released on Election Day, November 6, 2012.

Glow, Barone's fifth solo album, helmed by producer Tony Visconti, was released in September 2010 on Bar/None Records.  A majority of the album was also co-written with Visconti. Also working on the project were producers Steve Rosenthal and Steve Addabbo, songwriter Paul Williams, chief engineer Leslie Ann Jones at George Lucas's Skywalker Ranch, photographer Mick Rock, and others. A portrait of Barone from the Glow photo sessions appeared in Rock's career retrospective book Exposed: The Faces of Rock n' Roll. A tour of the U.S. and the U.K. followed in early 2011.

In August, Barone was named to the Board of Advisors of Anthology Film Archives where he worked closely with Jonas Mekas and produced live fundraising events for the organization.

In Fall 2011, Richard made a cameo appearance and performed a song in the film Mr. Bricks: A Heavy Metal Murder Musical.

On September 11, 2011, the tenth anniversary of 9/11, Barone released a re-write of the 1894 song "The Sidewalks of New York" with updated lyrics that referenced the World Trade Center attack, co-written and produced by collaborator Matthew Billy.

In December 2011, Barone was appointed as a professor at the Clive Davis Institute of Recorded Music at New York University where he began teaching "Stage Presence: The Art of Performance."

A second anthology released that month, Collection 2: Before & Afterglow, mined his back catalogue to his pre-Bongos days in Tampa and included recent work such as the Sidewalks of New York single.

On May 4, 2012, for the 25th anniversary of his Cool Blue Halo album, a reunion concert of all the original musicians was held at City Winery in New York. The concert was filmed and recorded as part of a multi-disc box set released by DigSin Records. In September 2012, he released the first single from the project, "I Belong To Me." In December, I Belong To Me: The 'Cool Blue Halo' Story premiered at Anthology Film Archives, followed by a performance by Barone and musicians from the album. On the occasion of the box set's release, Donovan wrote: "Well-deserved appreciation to Richard on this 25th anniversary release of his album 'Cool Blue Halo.' He displayed the stance early, like the minstrel/actor/playwright of Renaissance London. We met and have shared many a stage together... I have always loved Ricardo's 'Bar-oque and Roll' music. Shine On Ricardo, Shine!"

Through his work with Pete Seeger, Barone was asked to contribute a song to the Occupy This Album project on Razor & Tie, to benefit the Occupy Wall Street Movement. The four-disc set, subtitled "99 Songs for the 99%", was released on May 15, 2012. Co-written with Matthew Billy, "Hey, Can I Sleep On Your Futon?" was a new song with contemporary references that was inspired by "Brother, Can You Spare A Dime?", a popular song from the Great Depression. Both the track and music video, produced by film students from NYU, were included on the original album download. Barone also performed at a series of concerts with other artists on the Occupy album including Michael Moore, David Amram, and Tom Chapin.

That same month, the feature documentary about Anna Nicole Smith, Addicted to Fame, was released, along with Barone's single "(She's A Real) Live Wire" from the film. He also served as music supervisor for the feature documentary, directed by David Giancola.

In June 2013, Barone joined forces with Beach Boys co-founder Al Jardine and friends to record a version of Pete Seeger's folk anthem "If I Had A Hammer (The Hammer Song)" for the ONE Campaign, produced by Steve Addabbo at Shelter Island Sound studios in New York. The video was released as ONE Campaign's worldwide protest song project.

On July 31, 2013, The Bongos performed the final concert at their home club, Maxwell's, where the original members had also performed the venue's first show. From the stage Richard announced that the group's long-lost album Phantom Train, recorded in Compass Point, Bahamas in 1986, would finally be released on October 1, 2013 on the re-launched JEM Records.

Also in 2013, Matthew Sweet and Susanna Hoffs recorded Barone's song "The Bulrushes" on their album Under the Covers, Vol. 3.

Barone partnered with Alejandro Escovedo on March 14, 2014 to produce and co-host the first major tribute to the late Lou Reed at the Paramount Theatre in Austin, Texas, as part of the SXSW Music Festival. The three-hour concert included over twenty-four acts including Suzanne Vega, Lucinda Williams, Sean Lennon, and Spandau Ballet. The house band included members of Blondie, the Patti Smith Group, and the Voidoids. Barone also released a recording of Reed's "All Tomorrow's Parties" produced by Chris Seefried with a video by Jonas Mekas assembled from footage of the early Velvet Underground at Andy Warhol's Factory.

In October 2014 Barone launched "A Circle of Songs," a live, monthly musical talk show series at SubCulture below the Lynn Redgrave Theater in Greenwich Village. Guests included Eric Andersen, Nellie McKay, Holly Near, and Captain Kirk Douglas of the Roots.

As 2015 began, Barone co-produced, with Tony Visconti, a retrospective concert of Visconti's most familiar work at New York's City Winery entitled "The TV Show." He also began work on a new album Sorrows & Promises: Greenwich Village in the 1960s, composed of songs that emerged from the early days of the Greenwich Village singer-songwriter scene. The album was curated by music writer/Columbia Records executive Mitchell Cohen, with sessions produced by Steve Addabbo and featuring guest appearances from Dion, John Sebastian and David Amram. A series of musical panel discussions chronicling the music on Sorrows & Promises, hosted by the New York Public Library at the historic Jefferson Market Library branch in Greenwich Village preceded the album's October 14, 2016 release. In March 2017, Barone brought the Sorrows & Promises project to the SXSW Music Festival in Austin, Texas where he hosted a five-and-a-half-hour showcase based on the album.

Back in the studio, Barone produced an album for jazz singer Hilary Kole of songs made famous by Judy Garland and a various-artists holiday album for the Miranda Music label on which he appears, as well as a second album of recordings made by Tiny Tim, entitled Tiny Tim's America, released in summer 2016. In addition, he served as executive producer of the musical Tiny, based on the life of Tiny Tim, and produced a songbook album for composer Tracy Stark featuring performances by Lesley Gore, actress Karen Black, and Nona Hendryx, released in October 2016. Barone then contributed liner notes to the vinyl re-issue of The Holy Mackerel, the debut of the 1960s band featuring songwriter Paul Williams. Later, in 2018, he would contribute liner notes for Williams' 1970 solo debut Someday Man.

In April 2017, Barone was elected to the board of governors of the New York Chapter of The Recording Academy (The Grammys). He would be re-elected for a second term in 2019.

In December 2017, he entered the studio to begin producing a tribute for Dean Martin's Centennial, performed by NJ-based group Remember Jones and featuring a duet with Martin's daughter Deana Martin. In June 2018, Barone would be invited by Martin to perform at the Friars Club as she was honored with the Trobairitz title.

On March 29, 2018, Barone performed in The Bowie Songbook, a reinterpretation of David Bowie's catalogue with Burnt Sugar Arkestra, as part of Brooklyn Museum's David Bowie Is installation.

Also in March, he began a new monthly Village Nights salon series at the historic Washington Square Hotel in New York City.

In April it was announced that Barone would host and curate Music + Revolution: Greenwich Village in the 1960s at City Parks Foundation's SummerStage in Central Park  on August 12, 2018. Performers included Jesse Colin Young, Melanie, José Feliciano, Maria Muldaur, John Sebastian, and others. The next week it was announced that Richard had joined the faculty of The New School for Jazz and Contemporary Music and was set to teach a 15-week music history course on 1960s Greenwich Village, with the same title as the Central Park concert.

Barone represented the New York Chapter of the Recording Academy for Grammys on the Hill in Washington D.C., meeting with Congress in support of the Music Modernization Act (MMA), an omnibus bill supporting the rights of music creators. He met with Senator Patrick Leahy, Congressman David Cicilline, Representative Joseph Crowley, Representative Nancy Pelosi, and the office of Senator Sheldon Whitehouse. Barone also met with New York Representative Jerrold Nadler, key supporter of the Music Modernization Act. The bill passed unanimously by both houses of Congress and was signed into law on October 11, 2018.

In January 2019, Barone accompanied Donovan in Jamaica to record a tribute album to Harry Belafonte. Barone also photographed Donovan for the cover of the album's first single. A second project with Donovan that year, a tribute to Brian Jones of the Rolling Stones, was recorded and filmed in Jones' hometown of Cheltenham, England on the fiftieth anniversary of his passing. Barone was the musical director of the project, which celebrated the American blues music that inspired the early Stones.
 
In fall 2019, a new guitar effect pedal "The Mambo Sun," a collaboration between Barone and boutique pedal manufacturer Left Coast Workshop, was launched for sale. It was designed to replicate Barone's distinctive double-tracked guitar tone.

Joining forces with Glenn Mercer, guitarist/frontman of The Feelies, Barone began performing a series of concerts entitled Hazy Cosmic Jive, a tribute to the mid-1970s experimentation of David Bowie, Brian Eno, Roxy Music, Marc Bolan and others.

In 2020 Barone made a cameo acting appearance, playing himself, in the indie film The Incoherents directed by Jared Barel. He also appeared in the documentaries Tiny Tim: King for a Day  and You Don't Know Ivan Julian.

Barone performed "Streets of New York" on Willie Nile Uncovered, a tribute to the singer-songwriter, released in August 2020.

He also sang on four tracks on Angelheaded Hipster: The Songs of Marc Bolan & T.Rex produced by Hal Willner, contributing backing vocals to tracks by Todd Rundgren, Lucinda Williams, Kesha, and Helga Davis. The album was released on September 4, 2020 by BMG Records.

Barone performed a medley of "Revolution" and "Power to the People" for JEM Records Celebrates John Lennon, released on the 80th anniversary of Lennon's birth, October 9, 2020. He also contributed an essay about Pylon for the book included in the comprehensive Pylon Box vinyl box set released on November 6, 2020, by New West Records.

On January 8, 2021 David Bowie's cover of John Lennon's song "Mother," for which Barone had sung harmony vocals with producer Tony Visconti at the original session in 1998, was released on limited edition vinyl and digital streaming on Parlophone Records. The single was released to commemorate Bowie's seventy-fourth birthday. In July, The Bongos' Beat Hotel - Expanded Edition was released by RCA Records. Later that month, Barone contributed two tracks to JEM Records Celebrates Brian Wilson.

On January 20, 2022, he began hosting the Folk Radio show on WBAI Radio, New York. The program is broadcast live on Thursdays at 10 p.m. ET on 99.5 FM, and streamed live on WBAI.org. Barone's new book, Music + Revolution: Greenwich Village in the 1960s, was published by Rowman & Littlefield on September 15, 2022. A major launch event was held at the Museum of the City of New York on October 13, 2022.

Selected discography

 Nuts and Bolts (1983), with James Mastro; produced by Barone, Mastro, and Mitch Easter (Passport Records)
 Cool Blue Halo (1987), recorded live at The Bottom Line, New York City (Passport Records); Deluxe Edition (2012, DigSin/RBM Special Editions)
 Primal Dream (1990), produced by Richard Gottehrer and Don Dixon (MCA Records)
 Primal Cuts (1991), remixes by Ben Grosse and live tracks (Line Records, Germany)
 Clouds over Eden (1993), produced by Hugh Jones (MESA/Bluemoon/Atlantic Records)
 Between Heaven and Cello (1997), recorded live (Line Records, Germany)
 The Big Three (2000), box set (Line Records, Germany)
 Collection: An Embarrassment of Richard (2004), compilation (RBM Special Editions)
 Glow (2010), produced by Tony Visconti, Steve Addabbo, Steve Rosenthal, and Richard Barone (Bar/None Records); Deluxe Edition (2019)
 Collection 2: Before & Afterglow (2011), compilation (RBM Special Editions/Billy Barone Productions)
 Cool Blue Halo: 25th Anniversary Concert (2012), Deluxe live album/concert movie, CD/DVD, produced by Matthew Billy (DigSin/RBM Special Editions)
 Sorrows & Promises: Greenwich Village in the 1960s (2016), produced by Steve Addabbo (RBM Special Editions/The Orchard; Ship To Shore PhonoCo)

Contributions
 For the Love of Harry: Everybody Sings Nilsson (1995), MusicMasters Records/BMG - "I Guess The Lord Must Be in New York City"
 Refuge: A Benefit for the People of Kosova (1999), ARC/The Orchard - "A Call To Prayer"
 Our Favorite Texan: Bobby Fuller Four-ever! (1999), #9 Records, Japan - "Nancy Jean"
 Lynne Me Your Ears – A Tribute to the Music of Jeff Lynne (2001), Not Lame Recordings - "Showdown"
 Simply Mad, Mad, Mad, Mad About The Loser's Lounge (2001), Zilcho Records - "Everybody's Talking"
 The Nomi Song Remixes (2005), Palm Pictures - "Total Eclipse: The Atomic Party Mix"
 October Project Uncovered: The Songs of Emil Adler & Julie Flanders (2006), October Project Recordings - "One Dream"
 Occupy This Album (2012), Razor & Tie - "Hey, Can I Sleep On Your Futon?"
 A New York Holiday (2015), Miranda Music - "I've Got My Love To Keep Me Warm"
 Joolz Juke: Blues Tribute to Brian Jones by his Grandson Joolz Jones (2019), Donovan Discs - "Who Do You Love?", "Not Fade Away"
 Willie Nile: Uncovered (2020), Paradiddle Records - "Streets of New York" 
 AngelHeaded Hipster - The Songs Of Marc Bolan And T. Rex (2020), BMG Records - Backing vocals on several tracks.
 Jem Records Celebrates John Lennon (2020), Jem Records - "Revolution/Power to the People"
 Jem Records Celebrates Brian Wilson (2021), Jem Records - "In My Room", "I Get Around"
 Jem Records Celebrates Pete Townshend (2022), Jem Records - "Let's See Action"
 We All Shine On: A Tribute to the Year 1970 (2022), SpyderPop Records - "Riki Tiki Tavi" (Donovan) 
 Tribute to a Songpoet: Songs of Eric Andersen (2022), Y&T Music - "Close the Door Lightly"

Concert productions
 "The Downtown Messiah" - Various Artists - The Bottom Line; Winter Garden Atrium at World Financial Center NYC, Broadcast via Public Radio International, 1999–2004. 
 "There'll Be Another Spring: A Tribute to Miss Peggy Lee" - Various Artists - Carnegie Hall NYC, Broadcast via NPR, 2003. 
 "There'll Be Another Spring: A Tribute to Miss Peggy Lee" - Various Artists - Hollywood Bowl, Los Angeles, CA ; Ravinia Festival, Chicago, 2004.  
 "The (Not So) Great American Songbook" - Various Artists - SummerStage in Central Park NYC, 2004.
 "Frontman: A Musical Reading" - Various Artists - Carnegie Hall NYC, 2008.
 "Reclaim the Coast: Benefit for the BP Oil Spill Cleanup" - Pete Seeger and Various Artists - City Winery NYC, 2010.
 "Return to the Pleasuredome: Benefit for Anthology Film Archives" - Various Artists including Lou Reed, Sonic Youth, and Kenneth Anger - Hiro Ballroom NYC, 2010.
 "2011 Film Preservation Honors & 40th Anniversary Benefit Concert" - Marina Abramović, Ólöf Arnalds, Albert Maysles, Jonas Mekas, more. - City Winery NYC, 2011.
 "The SXSW Tribute to Lou Reed" (Co-produced with Alejandro Escovedo) - Various Artists - Paramount Theater, Austin Texas, 2014. 
 "The TV Show: Tony Visconti & Friends" (Co-produced with Tony Visconti) - Various Artists - City Winery NYC, 2015.
 "Sorrows & Promises SXSW: Greenwich Village in the 1960s" - Various Artists including Jesse Colin Young, Robyn Hitchcock - SXSW, Driskill Hotel, Austin Texas, 2017. 
 "Music + Revolution: Greenwich Village in the 1960s, hosted by Richard Barone" - Various Artists - SummerStage in Central Park, NYC, August 12, 2018.  
 "Remembering Jonas: A Tribute to Jonas Mekas" - Various Artists including Patti Smith, John Zorn, Jim Jarmusch, Steve Buscemi, Lee Ranaldo, others. - City Winery NYC, February 21, 2019.

Bibliography
Frontman: Surviving the Rock Star Myth, Backbeat/Hal Leonard Books, 2007. , 
The White Label Promo Preservation Society: 100 Flop Albums You Ought to Know, HoZac Books, 2021. Essay on T.Rex. 
 Music + Revolution: Greenwich Village in the 1960s, Backbeat Books/Rowman & Littlefield, 2022. 
 Tape Op Magazine, regular contributor

See also
 Tony Visconti
 Mick Rock
 The Bongos

References

External links

Year of birth missing (living people)
Living people
20th-century American composers
American rock guitarists
American male guitarists
American male singer-songwriters
Record producers from New York (state)
American rock singers
American rock songwriters
Singer-songwriters from Florida
Singers from New York City
Musicians from Tampa, Florida
People from Manhattan
People from Greenwich Village
20th-century American singers
20th-century American guitarists
21st-century American guitarists
Guitarists from Florida
Guitarists from New York City
20th-century American male singers
21st-century American male singers
21st-century American singers
Singer-songwriters from New York (state)
The New School faculty